Tell Mashnaqa is an archaeological site located on the Khabur River, a tributary to the Euphrates, about  south of Al-Hasakah in northeastern Syria. The earliest occupation of the site dates to the Ubaid period (ca. 5200–4900 BC), and was excavated by a Danish team from 1990–1995 in four seasons.

Overview

The mudbrick houses, found at the earliest level of the tell, had small rooms with fireplaces, grinding stones, mortars and painted pots. The later levels show a shift in occupation to other parts of the tell, where areas inhabited earlier were turned into a refuse midden and later a cemetery. The site was later abandoned for hundreds of years only to be rebuilt again in the fourth millennium BC. This level had a large tripartite building measuring about 11.5 by 10.5 m.

Boat models
One of the most remarkable finds at the Ubaid level of the site were fragments of two pottery boat models, excavated in 1991. The models represented long, narrow canoes with pointed sterns. The boats were probably made of reed coated with bitumen to make them waterproof. The findings strongly suggest that people of the Khabur region had already made use of boats for transport and fishing by c. 5000 BC, if not before. Similar models have been unearthed from other Ubaid sites such as Eridu, Ubaid, Uqair and Abada.

References

Neolithic sites in Syria
Former populated places in Syria
Archaeological sites in al-Hasakah Governorate
Ubaid period